Joan Sallis  was a British writer on educational matters, particularly in relation to school governance. She was the agony aunt behind the Times Educational Supplement's Ask the Expert column.

In 1996, she was awarded an honorary degree of Doctor of Laws by Oxford Brookes University.

Joan was the national president of the Campaign for State Education (CASE).She died in 2019, aged 91.

Bibliography
Basics for School Governors, by Joan Sallis,   published by Network Educational Press
Community Governors: your own guide, by Joan Sallis,  published by Adamson Publishing
Effective Governors, Effective Schools: Developing the Partnership, by Joan Sallis and Michael Creese,   published by David Fulton Publishers
Effective School Governors, by Joan Sallis,  published by Pearson Education
Foundation Governors in Faith Schools: your own guide, by Joan Sallis,  published by Adamson Publishing
Heads in Partnership (School Leadership & Management), by Joan Sallis,  published by Pearson Education
Local Authority Governors: your own guide, by Joan Sallis,  published by Adamson Publishing
Questions School Governors Ask, by Joan Sallis,   published by Network Educational Press
Parent Governors: your own guide, by Joan Sallis,  published by Adamson Publishing
Staff Governors: your own guide, by Joan Sallis,  published by Adamson Publishing
The Parent Governor Book, by Joan Sallis,  published by Advisory Centre for Education

References

External links
Personal website
CASE website

Year of birth missing
British educators
Officers of the Order of the British Empire
School governors
British journalists
2019 deaths